The Betty Ford Alpine Gardens are one of the world's highest botanical garden, located at 183 Gore Creek Drive, Vail, Colorado, United States, at an  altitude in the Rocky Mountains. The Gardens are open to the public year-round. 

The Gardens were founded by Vail and Denver horticulturists in 1985, with subsequent planting of the Alpine Display Garden (1987), Mountain Perennial Garden (1989), Mountain Meditation Garden (1991), and the Alpine Rock Garden (1999) with its stunning 120-foot waterfall. Other gardens include the Children's Garden and Schoolhouse Garden. Together these gardens contain about 2,000 varieties of plants, including over 500 different varieties of wildflowers and alpine plants. The gardens were named in honour of first lady Betty Ford in 1988. 

It is open daily; admission is free.

See also 
 List of botanical gardens in the United States

References 

Botanical gardens in Colorado
Protected areas of Eagle County, Colorado